The Republic of the Congo is divided into twelve departments (départements, singular département). These departments replaced former regions (régions, singular région) in 2002:

These regions are subdivided into 86 districts and 7 communes; which are further subdivided into urban communities (communautés urbaines) and rural communities (communautés rurales); which are further subdivided into quarters or neighborhoods (quartiers) and villages.

See also 
 Communes of the Republic of the Congo
 Districts of the Republic of the Congo
 ISO 3166-2:CG

References

External links
 Congo Departments at Statoids.com

 
Subdivisions of the Republic of the Congo
Congo, Republic of, Departments
Congo, Republic of 1
Departments, Congo, Republic of
Republic of the Congo geography-related lists